Roy Lake may refer to:

Roy Lake, Minnesota, an unincorporated community
Roy Lake State Park, a state park in South Dakota
Lac de Roy, a lake in France